William Joseph Donlon (born February 10, 1977) is an American college basketball coach, currently an associate head coach at Clemson University.

Playing career
Donlon played four years of basketball at UNC Wilmington under Jerry Wainwright, scoring 901 career points and handing out 457 assists. After graduation, Donlon played professionally in France, Germany, and Ireland.

Coaching career
Donlon started his coaching career with American and St. Peters as an assistant coach before returning to his alma mater to be an assistant coach under Brad Brownell for four seasons. He followed Brownell when he accepted the position at Wright State. When Brownell departed for the head coaching position at Clemson, Donlon was elevated to the head coach of the Raiders.

Wright State athletic director Bob Grant said: “Coach Donlon brings not only an ability to continue what has been laid in place but also a wealth of basketball knowledge and expertise to his new position. We are confident that Billy will continue building our program and take Raider basketball to another level of success.”

On March 18, 2016, Wright State fired Donlon after 6 seasons as head coach.

On May 4, 2016, Donlon was named assistant head coach for the Michigan Wolverines men's basketball team.

On June 25, 2017, Donlon was hired as an assistant coach for the Northwestern Wildcats men's basketball team, replacing Pat Baldwin, who had taken the head coaching job at Milwaukee.

On March 26, 2019, Donlon was named the head coach of the UMKC men's basketball team. He replaced Kareem Richardson and is the first UMKC coach to take the position with previous head coaching experience since  2001.

Head coaching record

References

External links
 Wright State profile

1977 births
Living people
American Eagles men's basketball coaches
American expatriate basketball people in France
American expatriate basketball people in Germany
American expatriate basketball people in Ireland
American men's basketball coaches
American men's basketball players
Basketball coaches from Illinois
Basketball players from Illinois
College men's basketball head coaches in the United States
Ireland men's national basketball team players
Irish men's basketball players
Michigan Wolverines men's basketball coaches
Northwestern Wildcats men's basketball coaches
People from Northbrook, Illinois
Point guards
Sportspeople from Cook County, Illinois
Kansas City Roos men's basketball coaches
UNC Wilmington Seahawks men's basketball coaches
UNC Wilmington Seahawks men's basketball players
Wright State Raiders men's basketball coaches